Sidney Burgoyne Kitchener Caulfield (1877–1964) was head of architecture at the Central School of Arts and Crafts. He succeeded Halsey Ricardo. He designed a number of buildings at  Hampstead Garden Suburb.

References 

1877 births
1964 deaths
20th-century English architects
Hampstead Garden Suburb